This list follows Pern historical order and includes Pern short fiction. See Dragonriders of Pern for publication order and for more bibliographic data on the short fiction.

Dragonriders of Pern is a science fiction series initiated by Anne McCaffrey with the Hugo Award–winning novella Weyr Search in 1967.
The stories feature human history on the planet Pern, which might be called human-draconian society for its lifelong inter-species relationships between humans and dragons. Anne McCaffrey wrote all the Pern stories until 2003; as of 2012, eight books by her son Todd McCaffrey or by Anne and Todd have continued the series. In all, there are 24 novels, two collections of short fiction, and a few uncollected works. That includes one book by Anne and Todd published in July 2012, several months after her death, and one published by her daughter Gigi in 2018.

This list follows Pern historical order, which is different from the order of publication. The sequence is disputable at some points because many of the works overlap in time or feature travel between times; limited annotations are provided here.

The point of reference for Pern chronology is "Landing", when transport ships arrived and human settlement began. Years, or "Turns" around Pern's sun, are counted After Landing or "AL".

Before Landing
The planet Rukbat 3 was surveyed about 200 years before settlement ("Landing").
 The Chronicles of Pern: First Fall (1993 collection)
 "The Survey: P.E.R.N."

First Pass
These stories are set before and during the First Pass, from just before settlers landed on Pern until about fifty years afterward (0 to 50 AL).
 Dragonsdawn (1988)
 "Landing" (0 to 2 AL)
 "Thread" (8 AL)
 "Crossing" (8 to 9 AL)
 The Chronicles of Pern: First Fall (1993 collection)
 "The Dolphins' Bell"
 "The Ford of Red Hanrahan"
 "The Second Weyr"
 "Rescue Run"

First Interval
Just after the First Pass, 58 years after landing.
 Dragonsblood (2005, by Todd McCaffrey) – set partly in 58 AL, primarily in 508 AL; see Third Pass

Second Pass
Just before and during the Second Pass, about 250 years after landing.
 Red Star Rising (1996) (called Dragonseye for US release)

Third Pass
Just before and during the Third Pass, about 500 years after landing.
 Dragon's Kin (2004, Anne & Todd McCaffrey)
 Dragon's Fire (2006, Anne & Todd McCaffrey) – part one during Dragon's Kin
 Dragon Harper (2007, Anne & Todd McCaffrey)
 Dragonsblood (2005, Todd McCaffrey) – most events; see also First Interval
 Dragonheart (2008, Todd McCaffrey) – frame during Dragonsblood
 Dragongirl (2010, Todd McCaffrey)
 Dragon's Time (2011, Anne & Todd McCaffrey)
 Sky Dragons (2012, Anne & Todd McCaffrey)

Sixth Pass
Late in the Sixth Pass, about 1550 years after landing.
 Moreta: Dragonlady of Pern (1983)
 Nerilka's Story (1986) – coincident with Moreta
 "Beyond Between" – short story in Legends II: New Short Novels by the Masters of Modern Fantasy (2003)

Ninth Pass
Just before and during the Ninth Pass, about 2500 years after landing.
 The Masterharper of Pern (1998) – set 55 years before the Pass until the first part of Dragonflight
 "Runner of Pern" (1998) – novella later collected in A Gift of Dragons
 Dragonflight (1968) – first novel written, a fix-up of two previously published stories
 "Weyr Search" 
 "Dragonrider" 
 Dragonquest (1970)
 Dragonsong (1976) – during Dragonquest, closing almost simultaneously
 Dragonsinger (1977) – during seven days following Dragonsong
 Dragondrums (1979) – closing before the end of The White Dragon
 Dragon's Code (2018, Gigi McCaffrey) – concurrent to The White Dragon
 The White Dragon (1978) – incorporating the short story A Time When (1975)
 "The Impression" (1989) – short story by Jody Lynn Nye and Anne McCaffrey in The Dragonlover's Guide to Pern
 "The Smallest Dragonboy" (1973) – short story later collected in A Gift of Dragons. It is also found in the anthology "Get Off The Unicorn" published by Del Rey press.
 "The Girl Who Heard Dragons" (1986) – novella later collected in A Gift of Dragons – early during The Renegades of Pern
 The Renegades of Pern (1989)
 All the Weyrs of Pern (1991)
 The Dolphins of Pern (1994) – during and immediately after All the Weyrs of Pern
 The Skies of Pern (2001)
 After the Fall is Over (in progress since 2011) – set after the Ninth Pass in "New Era Pern"

Undatable
One short story cannot be dated even approximately. Some readers have inferred that it takes place during the Second or Third Pass.
 "Ever the Twain" (2002) – original to the collection A Gift of Dragons

Notes

References